Jayant Salgaonkar (1 February 1929 – 20 August 2013) was an Indian Jyotishi (Astrologer), businessman, historian, scholar, and writer. He was the founder of Kalnirnay.

Education and career
Salgaonkar only completed up to tenth grade in high school. He had keen interest in astrology from childhood. He founded Kalnirnay in 1973, selling over 10 million copies in nine languages. Kalnirnay is a yearly almanac of all religions containing details of auspicious dates, festivals and celebrations of Farsi, Jews, Muslims, Christians, Hindu and others. He had done a combination of jyotish, information and dharmashstra. He was the pioneer of the daily Rashi Bhavishya and the daily crossword in the Marathi newspaper.

Books written
 Sundarmath - ‘सुंदरमठ’ (समर्थ रामदासस्वामींच्या जीवनावरील कादंबरी )
 Deva tuchi Ganeshu - ‘देवा तूचि गणेशु’(श्रीगणेश दैवताचा इतिहास आणि स्वरुप, तसेच समाजजीवनावरील त्याचा प्रभाव याचा अभ्यासपूर्ण आढावा.)
 Dharma-Shatriy Nirnay -‘धर्म-शास्त्रीय निर्णय’ या ग्रंथाचे संपादन व लेखन
 Kalnirnay- ‘कालनिर्णय’ या मराठी, इंग्रजी, गुजराथी, हिंदी, कानडी, तामिळ, बंगाली, तेलगू, मल्याळम भाषेतून निघणार्‍या वार्षिक नियतकालिकाचे संस्थापक-संपादक.
 Panchang - ‘पंचाग’ या क्षेत्रात सुलभता आणि शास्त्रशुद्धता आणण्याचे यशस्वी प्रयत्न. पंचांगाचा परंपरागत साचा बदलून नवीन स्वरुपात संपादन.
 Devachiye Dwari - ‘देवाचिये द्वारी’ (धार्मिक, पारमार्थिक अशा स्वरुपाचे लिखाण संत वाड्:मयाच्या आधाराने १९२५ मध्ये ३०९ लेखांचा संग्रह) पुढे त्याचे अनेक खंड
 Ganadhish jo Ish - ‘गणाधीश जो ईश’(श्रीगणेशावरील लेख व मुलाखती वृत्तपत्रांतून प्रसिध्द झालेल्या लेखांचा संग्रह)
 Rastyvarache Dive - ‘रस्त्यावरचे दिवे’ (आयुष्यात घडलेल्या, अनुभवाला आलेल्या, तसेच कुणाकडून तरी समजलेल्या प्रत्यक्ष घटनांवर आधारित लेखांचा संग्रह)

Personal life
He left behind his wife and three sons and grandchildren.

Death
Jyotirbhaskar Jayant Salgaonkar died in the Hinduja hospital in Mumbai after a brief illness.

Awards and recognition
 Jyotirbhasakr by Sakeshwar Vidhyapeeth
 Jyotishalankar by Mumbai Jyotirvidyalay
 Jyotimartand in Pune Jyotish Sammelan
 D.Lt. by Maharashtra Jyotish Vidyapeeth 
 Vaidik Puraskar at Nasik by Shivparvati Pratishthan
 Lifetime Achievement award by Konkan Marathi Sahitya Parishad
 Samarth Sant Seva Puraskar by Samarath Seva Mandal, Sajjangad

References

External links
 Kalnirnay.com

Businesspeople from Mumbai
Marathi people
1929 births
2013 deaths